This is a list of guilds in the United Kingdom.  It includes guilds of merchants and other trades, both those relating to specific trades, and the general guilds merchant in Glasgow and Preston.  No religious guilds survive, and the guilds of freemen in some towns and cities are not listed.  Almost all guilds were founded by the end of the 17th century, although some went out of existence and were refounded in the 20th century.

England

Alnwick
Black and White Smiths
Butchers
Cordwainers
Joiners and Shoemakers
Merchants
Skinners and Glovers
Tanners
Weavers

Bristol
Society of Merchant Venturers (1552), meets Merchant Hall

Carlisle
Butchers
Cordwainers
Merchants
Skinners and Glovers

Chester
Bakers (1462)
Barber Surgeons
Brewers
Bricklayers
Butchers
Cappers and Pinners
Coopers
Cordwainers
Goldsmiths (1573)
Innholders
Joiners (1578)
Masons
Mercers
Merchant Drapers
Merchant Taylors
Painters (1534)
Saddlers & Curriers
Skinners
Smiths
Tanners (1361)
Weavers
Wet and Dry Glovers (1380)
Wrights and Slaters

Cirencester
Weavers' Company (1550s), meets Weavers' Hall

Coventry
Broad Weavers and Clothiers (1665)
Company and Fellowship of Cappers and Feltmakers (1494); meets in Cappers' Room of old cathedral
Drapers (1534); meets in Drapers' Hall
Fellowship of Mercers
Fullers' Guild (1438)
Tanners' Guild
Worshipful Company of Worsted Weavers (1449; refounded 1703)

Durham
Barbers and Surgeons
Butchers
Cordwainers
Curriers
Drapers
Joiners
Masons and Plumbers
Tailors

Exeter
Incorporation of Weavers, Fullers and Shearmen (1495), meets Tuckers Hall

Kingston-upon-Hull
Guild of Masters, Pilots and Seamen of Trinity House (1369)

Lichfield
Worshipful Company of Smiths (by 1601)

London
 Guild of Freemen of the City of London

Newcastle-upon-Tyne
Bakers and Brewers (1342)
Barber-Surgeons (1442)
Bricklayers, Wallers and Plasterers (1454)
Butchers (1621)
Colliers, Paviors and Carriagemen (1656)
Coopers (1426)
Cordwainers (1566)
Curriers, Felt-makers and Armourers (1546)
Glovers (1436)
Goldsmiths (1536)
Society of Hostmen (1600)
House Carpenters, Millwrights and Trunkmakers (1579)
Joiners and Cabinet-makers (1589)
Society of Master Mariners (1492)
Masons (1581)
Merchant Adventurers (1215)
Milners (1578)
Plumbers and Glaziers (1536)
Ropemakers (1648)
Saddlers (1459)
Sail-makers (1663)
Scriveners (1675, refounded 1974)
Shipwrights (1636)
Skinners (1437)
Slaters and Tylers (1451)
Smiths (1436)
Tanners (1532)
Taylors (1536)
Upholsterers, Tin-plate workers and Stationers (1675)
Weavers (1527)

Norwich
Barber-surgeons (1439)
Guild of St George (1389; refounded)

Preston
Preston Guild (1179)

Richmond, North Yorkshire
Company of Fellmongers (refounded 1980)
Company of Mercers, Grocers and Haberdashers

Sheffield
Company of Cutlers in Hallamshire (1624), meets Cutlers' Hall

Shrewsbury
Drapers (1462); meets Drapers' Hall

Southwark
Guildable Manor (880AD, 1327), meets St George the Martyr, Southwark
King's Manor, Southwark (1103, 1550), meets Inner London Crown Court
Great Liberty of Southwark (1550), meets The Boot and Flogger
Tanners of Bermondsey (1703), meets St Mary Magdalen Bermondsey and The Leather Exchange

Worcester
Clothier's Guild (1590)

York
Gild of Freemen of the City of York (1953) meets Bedern Hall
Guild of Building (1954), meets Bedern Hall
Butchers Gild (1272), meets Jacob's Well
Company of Cordwainers (1395, refounded 1970s), meets Bedern Hall
Merchant Adventurers (1357), meets Merchant Adventurers' Hall
Company of Merchant Taylors (1386), meets Merchant Taylors' Hall
Guild of Weavers, Spinners and Dyers (1960)
 Guild of Scriveners (1478, refounded 1981)
Guild of Media Arts (2015)

Scotland

Aberdeen
Incorporated Trades of Aberdeen (1587)

Arbroath
Arbroath Guildry Incorporation (1725)

Ayr
Ayr Guildry (1325)

Brechin
Guildry Incorporation of Brechin (1629), meets Guildry Room of Brechin Mechanics' Institute

Dundee
Nine Incorporated Trades of Dundee

Edinburgh
Company of Merchants of the City of Edinburgh (1505), meets Merchants' Hall
Incorporated Trades of Edinburgh (1578)

Elgin
Glovers
Hammermen
Shoemakers
Squaremen
Tailors
Weavers

Glasgow
Merchants House of Glasgow (1605)
Trades House of Glasgow (1605)

Irvine
The Incorporated Trades of Irvine (1646)

Lanark
Guildry of Lanark (1658)

Perth
The Guildry Incorporation of Perth

Rutherglen
The Incorporation of Tailors of Rutherglen (1657)

Stirling
Merchant Guildry of Stirling (1226)

References

Guilds in England
Guilds in Scotland